William Pinkney (born September 15, 1935) is an American sailor and retired executive. In 1992, he became the first African American to sail around the world solo via the Cape of Good Hope and Cape Horn.

Early life
Pinkney was born and raised on the South Side of Chicago. His parents, Marion Henderson and William Pinkney Sr, divorced when he was young. He attended Tilden Technical High School and graduated in 1954.

Navy and later career
Pinkney joined the United States Navy in 1956, serving as a hospital corpsman. He left the Navy in 1964, and moved to Puerto Rico for a few years, where he learned how to sail.

After returning to the mainland in 1961, Pinkney worked as a marketing manager for Revlon and later the Johnson Products Company. He started planning to sail around the world in 1985, after being made redundant from his job at the Department of Human Services, and fundraised throughout the late 1980s.

Voyage
Pinkney's voyage around the world lasted 22 months. He departed from Boston on August 5, 1990, sailing first to Bermuda, then along the eastern South American coastline, across the Atlantic Ocean to Cape Town, South Africa, across the Indian Ocean to Hobart, Tasmania, across the South Pacific Ocean, around Cape Horn, and up the eastern South American coastline, finally ending up back in Boston.

Pinkney sailed on a Valiant 47, a 47-foot cutter named The Commitment. The expedition cost around $1 million.

On June 9, 1992, he arrived at the Charlestown Navy Yard in Boston Harbor where he was greeted by over 1,000 school students and 100 officers from the Navy, Coast Guard, and National Park Service.

The story of his trip was told in the documentary The Incredible Voyage of Bill Pinkney, based on Pinkney's own footage. The film won a 1992 Peabody Award. He also wrote a children's book about his experiences called Captain Bill Pinkney's Journey.

Amistad replica 
From 2000 to 2002, Pinkney served as the first captain of the replica of the Amistad. As captain, he took a group of teachers to Africa as part of a trip that traced the route of the Middle Passage crossing from Senegal to the Americas.

Awards and honors
He was named Chicago Yacht Club’s Yachtsman of the Year in 1992. In 1999, he was named one of the Chicagoans of the Year by Chicago magazine.

He is a member of the National Sailing Hall of Fame.

He was awarded The America and the Sea Award by Mystic Seaport Museum on October 26, 2022.

References

External links
 Capt. William "Bill" Pinkney, interview archive with The HistoryMakers (African American video oral history archive)

1935 births
Living people
People from Chicago
African-American sailors
United States Navy corpsmen
21st-century African-American people
20th-century African-American people
African-American United States Navy personnel